Aadesh-class patrol vessels are a series of twenty fast patrol vessels (FPVs) built for the Indian Coast Guard by Cochin Shipyard Limited at its shipyard in Kochi, Kerala. The ships have been designed by M/s Smart Engineering & Design Solutions (SEDS), Kochi.

Design
Aadesh class vessels have a length of 50 meters, a beam of 7.6 meters, and a draught of 1.6 meters with a design speed of over 33 knots. They are powered by Rolls-Royce Power Systems-supplied triple type 16V 4000 M90 engines with an output of 2,720kW (3,648BHP) at 2,100 rpm, coupled with ZF 7600 gearboxes and propelled by triple Rolls-Royce Kamewa 71S3NP water jets. This enables the vessels to operate in shallow waters and offers higher speeds and better maneuverability than conventional propellers. The MTU 'Callosum' ship automation system monitors the ship's services that also incorporates fire detection and extinguishing systems. The navigation package was supplied by Northrop Grumman and includes multi-function displays, electronic chart display and information system (ECDIS), autopilot, magnetic compass, and the NAVIGAT 3000 fiber optic gyro-compass.

The vessels are equipped with a long-range gun and modern vessel control, navigation, and communication tools. They are capable of 7 days' continuous deployment at sea without replenishing supplies. These FPVs are small in size when compared to other large vessels that Cochin Shipyard has built. Extensive use of aluminum in the superstructure was made to reduce weight, and Cochin Shipyard has developed special techniques to ensure high-quality welding and fabrication of aluminum structures. All the vessels delivered achieved speeds in excess of the contracted speed during sea trials and surpassed the expectations of the Indian Coast Guard with regard to the performance requirements.

The primary roles of the vessel include fisheries protection and monitoring, patrol within India's exclusive economic zone, coastal patrol, anti-smuggling, anti piracy, and search and rescue operations. The vessels also have a secondary role of providing communication link and escorting convoys during hostilities and wartime.

Ships of the class
Aadesh, the first vessel of the series, was launched on 9 January 2013 by Jayasree Muralidharan, in the presence of her husband, Vice Admiral M P Muralidharan, Director General of the Indian Coast Guard. Aadesh was delivered to the Coast Guard after successful completion of all its trials on 25 September 2013. It has been operated from the Coast Guard station at Tuticorin in Tamil Nadu.

The second vessel, named Abheek, was launched by on 21 March 2013. For the launch, the FPV was placed on specially-designed cradles and transported over the entire length of the Indigenous Aircraft Carrier that was located at the building dock before being lowered into the waters.

The third vessel, Abhinav, was launched on 28 May 2013. The fourth vessel, Abhiraj, was launched on 30 September 2013 and is expected to join the Tuticorin ICG station. The fifth and sixth Fast Patrol Vessels were launched on 2 December 2013 and were named Achook and Agrim in the launching ceremony.  Achook was handed over to the Coast Guard on 28 March 2014.

Operational history

Ships in class

See also
L&T Interceptor class fast attack craft
Solas Marine Fast Interceptor Boat
ABG Interceptor Class fast attack crafts
Couach fast interceptor boats

Manoram class ferry

References

External links
 Cochin Shipyard news archive
ICGS AADESH Launched
Smart Engineering & Design Solutions Ltd

Patrol boat classes
Fast attack craft of the Indian Coast Guard